Worlds is a collection of science fiction and fantasy short stories by Eric Flint. It was first published in hardcover and ebook format by Baen Books on February 1, 2009; a paperback edition was issued by the same publisher in October 2011.

The collection consists of ten short works of fiction, together with a preface, introductory notes introducing the individual stories and a bibliography of the author's works.

Contents
 "Preface"

The Belisarius series
 "Author's Note"
 "Islands" (from The Warmasters, May 2002)

The 1632 series
 "Author's Note"
 "The Wallenstein Gambit" (from Ring of Fire, January 2004)

The Anne Jefferson stories
 "Portraits" (from The Grantville Gazette, Oct. 2003)
 "Steps in the Dance" (from Grantville Gazette II, March 2006)
 "Postage Due" (from Grantville Gazette III, January 2007)

The Honor Harrington series
 "Author's Note"
 "From the Highlands" (from Changer of Worlds, March 2001)

The Joe's World series
 "Author's Note"
 "Entropy, and the Strangler" (from L. Ron Hubbard Presents Writers of the Future, Volume IX, October 1993)
 "The Realm of Words" (from Jim Baen's Universe, June 2007)

The Rats, Bats & Vats series
 "Author's Note"
 "Genie Out of the Bottle" (with Dave Freer) (from Cosmic Tales II: Adventures in Far Futures, February 2005)

The Ranks of Bronze series
 "Author's Note"
 "Carthago Delenda Est" (from Foreign Legions, June 2001)
 "Appendix: Eric Flint Bibliography"

References

2009 short story collections
Science fiction short story collections
Fantasy short story collections
Books by Eric Flint
American short story collections